Three Greyhound-class destroyers served with the Royal Navy during the First World War.

They were virtually identical to the  built a couple of years earlier by the same company, except that they used a different type of water-tube boiler; Yarrow rather than Thornycroft. These four boilers produced 6,100 hp to given them the required thirty knots and they were armed with the standard 12-pounder guns and two torpedo tubes.  They carried a complement of 63 officers and men. In 1913 the three - like all other surviving three-funnelled destroyers of the "30-knotter" group - were re-classed as C-class destroyers.

References

 

Destroyer classes
 
Ship classes of the Royal Navy